Atomsk may refer to:

 Atomsk (novel), a novel by Carmichael Smith (Paul M. A. Linebarger)
 Atomsk (FLCL character), a character in the anime FLCL